Nino Assirelli (23 July 1925 – 30 June 2018) was an Italian racing cyclist. He won stage 15 of the 1953 Giro d'Italia.

References

External links
 

1925 births
2018 deaths
Italian male cyclists
Italian Giro d'Italia stage winners
Place of birth missing
People from Forlì
Sportspeople from the Province of Forlì-Cesena
Cyclists from Emilia-Romagna